The Ponale road, Ponale highway or lately Alpine trail D 01 is a former highway that was the first road connection between the Garda Lake area and the Ledro valley.

History 
It was constructed by Giacomo Cis between 1848 and 1851 in the steep north-western ranges of the Garda Lake. The road suffered from regular landslides, so a separate road tunnel has been built in 1998. Since then the road had been officially closed, but has been popular by hikers and mountain-bikers. In 2000 another landslide happened with various casualties, so the road had been closed again. Due to the immense popularity of the track with impressive views of the lake and its tunnels it has been reopened after investing 820.000 € in 2004.

The old rest station above the Ponale valley is reopened since June 2014.

Hiking trails in Italy
Highways in Italy